Alacra, Inc. is a privately owned American company that provides information and workflow tools to financial institutions, corporations, and professional services firms.

The company was founded as Data Downlink Corporation in 1996 by Steven Goldstein and Michael Angle, and was renamed Alacra, Inc. in June 2001. It is headquartered in New York with an office in London.

Alacra received praise for going outside traditional media outlets and creating a "data feed produced by monitoring a group of financial commentators that includes bloggers."

References

External links
Alacra, Inc. Website

Business services companies established in 1996
Companies based in New York (state)
Database companies
1996 establishments in New York (state)